S v Mtewtwa is an important case in South African criminal law, dealing with the defence of compulsion. The accused, in custody, was threatened by a warder with solitary confinement unless he committed a criminal act. The court considered what State must prove in such circumstances in order to obtain a conviction.

The court held that, where an accused's defence is one of compulsion, the onus lies on the State to show that a reasonable man would have resisted the compulsion. There is no onus on the accused to satisfy the court that he acted under compulsion.

Specifically, where a person is in custody and is threatened by a warder with solitary confinement, then, held the court, at the very least the State must show that the accused could reasonably have complained to the prison authorities of the warder's wrongful conduct and that such complaint would have averted the threatened confinement.

See also 
 South African criminal law

References

Case law 
 S v Mtewtwa 1977 (3) SA 628 (E).

Notes 

1963 in South African law
1963 in case law
Eastern Cape Division cases